Composure may refer to:
 Calmness
 Equanimity
 Composure (Waking Ashland album), a 2005 album by Waking Ashland
 Composure, a 2016 album by Maala
 Composure, a 2018 album by Real Friends (band)
 "Composure" (song), a song by August Burns Red
 Composure, a horse that won the 2002 Chandelier Stakes
 Composure, an attribute in Vampire: The Masquerade